Memories of a Color is the debut studio album by Swedish singer-songwriter Stina Nordenstam. It was originally released on Telegram Records Stockholm and Caprice Records in 1991.

Track listing

Personnel
Credits adapted from liner notes.

 Stina Nordenstam – vocals, piano, keyboards
 Mats Persson – percussion
 Magnus Persson – percussion
 André Ferrari – percussion
 Rafael Sida – percussion
 Christin Veltman – percussion
 Christian Spering – percussion
 Backa Hans Eriksson – bass guitar
 Max Schultz – bass guitar
 Ulf Janson – guitar
 Henrik Janson – guitar, keyboards
 Anders Persson – guitar, keyboards
 Johan Ekelund – keyboards
 Johan Hörlén — keyboards
 David Wilczewski – saxophone
 Lasse Andersson – guitars, cither
 Per Hammarström – violin
 Ronnie Sjökvist – violin
 Anna Harju – viola
 Kerstin Isaksson – cello
 Katarina Wassenius – cello
 Staffan Svensson – trumpet
 Johan Ahlin – French horn
 Jan Lejonclou – French horn

Charts

References

External links
 

1992 debut albums
Stina Nordenstam albums
East West Records albums